Watts Building may refer to:

Watts Building (Birmingham, Alabama), listed on the NRHP in Alabama
Watts Building (San Diego, California), listed on the NRHP in California
Watts Building (Brighton, East Sussex), part of Brighton University